Behavioral and Brain Functions is a peer-reviewed open access scientific journal published by BioMed Central. It publishes articles on "all aspects of neurobiology where the unifying theme is behavior or behavioral dysfunction". It was established in 2005 with Terje Sagvolden as founding editor-in-chief, who was succeeded by Vivienne A. Russell (University of Cape Town). The current editor-in-chief is Wim Crusio (University of Bordeaux and Centre national de la recherche scientifique).

Abstracting and indexing
The journal is abstracted and indexed in:

According to the Journal Citation Reports, the journal has a 2021 impact factor of 3.950.

References

External links

Neuroscience journals
Behavioral neuroscience
BioMed Central academic journals
Publications established in 2005
English-language journals
Creative Commons Attribution-licensed journals
Continuous journals